Ann K. Symons is an American librarian. She served as a president of the American Library Association from 1998 to 1999 and prior to that Treasurer from 1992 to 1996.

Education 
Symons earned a Bachelor of Arts degree from the University of California and a Masters in Library Sciences degree from the University of Oregon.

Career 
She has been a school librarian since 1970 working in Alaska and Anglo American School of Moscow.

During her ALA Presidency, her presidential initiative was the adoption of a new ALA intellectual freedom statement Libraries: An American Value.

Awards
She was the 1999 recipient of the Robert B. Downs Intellectual Freedom Award from the American Library Association, the 2002 recipient of the Lippincott Award from the American Library Association, and the 2014 recipient of the Equality Award from the American library Association.

In 2017 she was given Honorary Membership in the American Library Association, the highest honor awarded.

Selected publications
Protecting the Right to Read (Neal Schuman, 1995) 
Speaking Out! Voices in Celebration of Intellectual Freedom (ALA Editions, 1999)

References 

 

American librarians
American women librarians
University of Oregon alumni
Presidents of the American Library Association
Year of birth missing (living people)
Living people
21st-century American women